Sweden participated in the Eurovision Song Contest 2022 in Turin, Italy, with "Hold Me Closer" performed by Cornelia Jakobs. The Swedish broadcaster  (SVT) organised  in order to select its entry for the contest.

Background 

This includes its  entry, "Voices", performed by Tusse, which ended 14th with 109 points in the final.

The Swedish national broadcaster,  (SVT), broadcasts the event within Sweden and organises the selection process for the nation's entry. Since 1959, SVT has organised the annual competition  in order to select the Swedish entry for the Eurovision Song Contest.

Before Eurovision

Melodifestivalen 2022 

The 2022 edition of  featured four heats, a semi-finals show (replacing the previously-held Second Chance round) and a final, and saw 28 acts compete. It was held between 5 February and 12 March 2022 in Stockholm, with the first three heats held at the Avicii Arena, and the remaining heat, the semi-finals and the final at the Friends Arena.

Heats 

 The first heat took place on 5 February 2022. "Hold Me Closer" performed by Cornelia Jakobs and "Innocent Love" performed by Robin Bengtsson qualified directly to the final, while "Hallabaloo" performed by Danne Stråhed and "" performed by Theoz advanced to the semi-final. "Moving Like That" performed by Omar Rudberg, "Let There Be Angels" performed by Shirley Clamp, and "Bananas" performed by Malou Prytz were eliminated from the contest.
 The second heat took place on 12 February 2022. "Bluffin" performed by Liamoo and "" performed by John Lundvik qualified directly to the final, while "" performed by Alvaro Estrella and "My Way" performed by Tone Sekelius advanced to the semi-final. "I Want to Be Loved" performed by Samira Manners, "Face in the Crowd" performed by Browsing Collection, and "" performed by Niello and Lisa Ajax were eliminated from the contest.
 The third heat took place on 19 February 2022. "Bigger Than the Universe" performed by Anders Bagge and "Freedom" performed by Faith Kakembo qualified directly to the final, while "Best to Come" performed by Lisa Miskovsky and "I Can't Get Enough" performed by Cazzi Opeia advanced to the semi-final. "" performed by Linda Bengtzing, "" performed by Lancelot, and "Shut Me Up" performed by Tribe Friday were eliminated from the contest.
 The fourth heat took place on 26 February 2022. "Run to the Hills" performed by Klara Hammarström and "" performed by Medina qualified directly to the final, while "Higher Power" performed by Anna Bergendahl and "Till Our Days Are Over" performed by Lillasyster advanced to the semi-final. "The End" performed by Angelino, "" performed by Tenori, and "" performed by Malin Christin were eliminated from the contest.
 The semi-finals took place as part of one show on 5 March 2022. From the first semi-final, "Higher Power" performed by Anna Bergendahl, and "My Way" performed by Tone Sekelius qualified to the final, while "" performed by Alvaro Estrella, and "Hallabaloo" performed by Danne Stråhed were eliminated from the contest. From the second semi-final, "" performed by Theoz, and "I Can't Get Enough" performed by Cazzi Opeia qualified to the final, while "Till Our Days Are Over" performed by Lillasyster, and "Best to Come" performed by Lisa Miskovsky were eliminated from the contest.

Final 
The final took place on 12 March 2022.

At Eurovision 
According to Eurovision rules, all nations with the exceptions of the host country and the "Big Five" (France, Germany, Italy, Spain and the United Kingdom) are required to qualify from one of two semi-finals in order to compete for the final; the top ten countries from each semi-final progress to the final. The European Broadcasting Union (EBU) split up the competing countries into six different pots based on voting patterns from previous contests, with countries with favourable voting histories put into the same pot. On 25 January 2022, an allocation draw was held which placed each country into one of the two semi-finals, as well as which half of the show they would perform in. Sweden was placed into the second semi-final, to be held on 12 May 2022, and scheduled to perform in the second half of the show.

Once all the competing songs for the 2022 contest had been released, the running order for the semi-finals was decided by the shows' producers rather than through another draw, so that similar songs were not placed next to each other.

Voting

Points awarded to Sweden

Points awarded by Sweden

Detailed voting results
The following members comprised the Swedish jury:
 Josefin Glenmark
 Michael Cederberg
 Miriam Annika Ehi Aigbogun
 Tara
 Tusse

References

Countries in the Eurovision Song Contest 2022
2022
Eurovision Song Contest
Eurovision Song Contest